John Langley (1943–2021) was an American television and film director.

John Langley may also refer to:

Politicians
John Langley (MP) (fl. 1653), English merchant and politician
John Langley (mayor), Lord Mayor of London 1576
John Langley (MP for Gloucestershire), MP for Gloucestershire 1429,1432,1435–1447
John de Langley, MP for Coventry
John W. Langley (1868–1932), American congressman

Others
John Langley (bishop) (1836–1930), Anglican bishop of Bendigo
John Baxter Langley (1819–1892), British political activist and newspaper editor
John Newport Langley (1852–1925), British physiologist
Art Langley (John Arthur Langley, 1896–1967), American ice hockey player
John Langley (rugby league), rugby league footballer of the 1960s and 1970s
John Langley (cricketer) (1918–1996), English cricketer
John Langley, English musician, member of The Blue Aeroplanes